The 1958 United States Senate election in Missouri was held on November 4, 1958. 

Incumbent Senator Stuart Symington was re-elected to a second term in office.

Democratic primary

Candidates
 Lamar Dye, Gladstone resident
 Lawrence Hastings, Aurora resident
 Stuart Symington, incumbent Senator

Results

Republican primary

Candidates
 Homer Cotton, nominee for Missouri's 8th congressional district in 1938
 Herman Grosby, perennial candidate
 Hazel Palmer, attorney, President of the Business and Professional Women's Foundation, and daughter of former U.S. Representative John William Palmer 
 William McKinley Thomas, perennial candidate

Results
Hazel Palmer became the first woman ever nominated for United States Senate in Missouri.

General election

Results

See also 
 1958 United States Senate elections

References 

1958
Missouri
United States Senate